The Journal of Asian Earth Sciences is a peer-reviewed scientific journal specializing in Earth processes with a focus on aspects of research related to Asia. The journal is published by Elsevier.

According to the Journal Citation Reports, the journal has a 2020 impact factor of 3.449.

As of May 2022 the editor-in-chief is Mei-Fu Zhou (Chinese Academy of Sciences).

References

English-language journals
Online-only journals
Earth and atmospheric sciences journals